O'Regan can refer to:

Places
O'Regan's, Newfoundland and Labrador, a village in Newfoundland, Canada

People
Brian O'Regan (disambiguation), several people
Daniel O'Regan, New Zealand rugby league player
Danny O'Regan, American ice hockey player
Denis O'Regan, photographer 
Dylan O'Regan, Irish American martial artist and submission grappler 
Hana O'Regan, New Zealand Maori activist
J. Kevin O'Regan, psychologist interested in phenomenal consciousness
Kate O'Regan, South African lawyer and judge
Katherine O'Regan, New Zealand politician
Mark O'Regan, New Zealand judge
Michael O'Regan, co-founder of Research Machines
Patrick O'Regan, New Zealand politician and jurist
Rolland O'Regan, New Zealand politician and surgeon
Seamus O'Regan, Canadian politician and former broadcast journalist
Susan O'Regan, New Zealand politician
Tarik O'Regan, British composer
Tipene O'Regan, New Zealand politician and educator
Thomas O'Regan, Australian academic

Figures in the Catholic Church
Anthony O'Regan, Catholic bishop
Cyril O'Regan